Frank Hodgson (born 1911, date of death unknown) was an English motorcycle speedway rider who rode for Hackney Wick Wolves and Middlesbrough Bears.

Born in Middlesbrough, Hodgson's first job in speedway was as a sign-writer at Hackney Wick in 1935. He had previously competed in grasstrack racing, and his early speedway experience was gained with the Amateur Riders' Club in Dagenham in 1936, where he also worked in the Ford factory. He signed for Nottingham in 1937, returning to Hackney Wick as a rider later that year. He was captain of Hackney's team in the second division in 1938 and 1939, before his career was interrupted by World War II, in which he served in the Royal Air Force. In 1946 he rode for Middlesbrough Bears, whom he also captained, his brother Jack also a member of the team. A fractured spine at the start of the season kept him out of speedway for two months, but he returned later in the season, winning a round of the British Riders' Championship, and leading his team to the Northern League title. 

He later moved on to Newcastle Diamonds and then in 1950 to Glasgow Tigers, missing the start of the 1952 season after falling from a ladder and breaking a rib.

Hodgson's son Russ and grandson Russell "Rusty" Hodgson both followed him into careers in speedway.

References

1911 births
British speedway riders
English motorcycle racers
Hackney Wick Wolves riders
Middlesbrough Bears riders
Glasgow Tigers riders
Newcastle Diamonds riders
Year of death missing
Royal Air Force personnel of World War II